Symphony for a Misanthrope is the sixth studio album by the progressive metal/rock band Magellan. The track "Pianissimo Intermission" is based upon Johann Sebastian Bach`s "Goldberg Variation#1" (1742).

Track listing
 "Symphonette" (instrumental) - 2:51
 "Why Water Weeds?" - 8:31
 "Wisdom" - 4:24
 "Cranium Reef Suite" - 18:05
 Pt.1: "Youthful Enthusiasm" (instrumental)
 Pt.2: "Psych 101"
 Pt.3: "Primal Defense"
 "Pianissimo Intermission" (instrumental) - 2:08
 "Doctor Concoctor" - 4:13
 "Every Bullet Needs Blood" - 6:42
 "Deconstruction Zone" (instrumental bonus track)

Credits 
 Trent Gardner — lead vocals, keyboards
 Wayne Gardner — guitars, bass, backing vocals

Invited participants 
 Steve Walsh — keyboards on 1
 Dave Manion — keyboards on 1
 Joe Franco — drums on 4, 5
 Stephen Imbler — piano on 5
 Robert Berry — drums, guitar, bass guitar on 2

References

External links
Encyclopaedia Metallum page

Magellan (band) albums
2005 albums